Aoufous is a town in Errachidia Province, Drâa-Tafilalet, Morocco. According to the 2004 census it has a population of 1272. It is located near the Aoufous Formation, which bears dinosaur fossils dating back to the Cenomanian, Late Cretaceous.

References

Populated places in Errachidia Province